Vasillaq Zëri (4 August 1952 -25 January 2019) was an Albanian footballer, of Greek origin, who played as a striker.

Club career
Born in Tirana, Zëri started his career with hometown club Shkëndija and was part of the 'Golden Age' of Dinamo Tirana between 1974 and 1988, where under the guidance of Skënder Jareci the club dominated Albanian football winning five championships and three Albanian Cups. Known for his dribbling skills and being able to play the ball with both legs, Zëri formed a successful offensive partnership with Ilir Përnaska and Shyqyri Ballgjini, which is considered to be the best offensive trio in Dinamo's history. Zëri impressed Ajax during Dinamo's 1980–81 European Cup clash with the Dutch giants and the latter insisted on buying him but they were told Albanian players were not allowed to move abroad.

International career
He made his debut for Albania on 3 November 1976 in the 3–0 friendly win versus Algeria and earned a total of 6 caps, scoring no goals. His final international was a September 1982 European Championship qualification match against Austria.

International statistics

Personal life
Zëri later worked for the Albanian Football Association. He was married to Vilma and they had two children, Julian and Inna.

Death
He died in January 2019 after a long illness.

Honours
Albanian Superliga: 4
 1975, 1976, 1977, 1980

Albanian Cup: 3
 1974, 1978, 1980

References

External links

1952 births
2019 deaths
Footballers from Tirana
Albanian footballers
Association football forwards
Albania international footballers
Shkëndija Tiranë players
FK Dinamo Tirana players
Kategoria Superiore players
Albanian football managers
FK Dinamo Tirana managers
Albania national under-21 football team managers